California's 13th State Assembly district is one of 80 California State Assembly districts. It is currently represented by Democrat Carlos Villapudua.

District profile 
The district consists of western San Joaquin County, including the eastern half of the Sacramento–San Joaquin River Delta, and is centered on Stockton. The district is a major gateway between the rest of the Central Valley and the San Francisco Bay Area.

San Joaquin County – 67.4%
 
 August
 Country Club
 French Camp
 Garden Acres
 Kennedy
 Lincoln Village
 Morada
 Mountain House
 Stockton
 Taft Mosswood
 Thornton
 Tracy

Election results from statewide races

List of Assembly Members 
Due to redistricting, the 13th district has been moved around different parts of the state. The current iteration resulted from the 2011 redistricting by the California Citizens Redistricting Commission.

Election results 1992 - present

1992

1994

1996

1998

2000

2002

2004

2006

2008

2010

2012

2014

2016

2018

2020

See also 
 California State Assembly
 California State Assembly districts
 Districts in California

References

External links 
 District map from the California Citizens Redistricting Commission

13
Government of San Joaquin County, California
Stockton, California
Tracy, California